Los miserables or Los Miserables  may refer to:

 Los miserables (1973 TV series)
 Los miserables (2014 TV series)
Los Miserables (band), a Chilean punk rock band